Ruslan Leont'evich Stratonovich was a Russian physicist, engineer, and probabilist and one of the founders of the theory of stochastic differential equations.

Biography
Ruslan Stratonovich was born on 31 May 1930 in Moscow. He studied from 1947 at the Moscow State University, specializing in there under P. I. Kuznetsov on radio physics (a Soviet term for oscillation physics - including noise - in the broadest sense, but especially in the electromagnetic spectrum). In 1953 he graduated and came into contact with the mathematician Andrey Kolmogorov. In 1956 he received his doctorate (theory of correlated random points apply to the calculation of electronic noise). In 1969 he became professor of physics at the Moscow State University.

Research
Stratonovich invented a stochastic calculus which serves as an alternative to the Itō calculus; the Stratonovich calculus is most natural when physical laws are being considered. The Stratonovich integral appears in his stochastic calculus. Here, the Stratonovich integral is named after him (at the same time developed by Donald Fisk). He also solved the problem of optimal non-linear filtering based on his theory of conditional Markov processes, which was published in his papers in 1959 and 1960. The Kalman-Bucy (linear) filter (1961) is a special case of Stratonovich's filter.

The Hubbard-Stratonovich transformation in the theory of path integrals (or distribution functions of statistical mechanics) was introduced by him (and used by John Hubbard in solid state physics).

In 1965, he developed the theory of pricing information (Value of information), which describes decision-making situations in which it comes to the question of how much someone is going to pay for information.

Awards
 Lomonosov Prize of the Moscow University, 1984
 USSR State Prize, 1988
 State Prize of the Russian Federation, 1996

See also
Filtering problem (stochastic processes)

Works
with P. I. Kuznetsov: The propagation of electromagnetic waves in multiconductor transmission lines, Pergamon Press 1964
Topics in the theory of random noise, 2 Volumes, Gordon and Breach, 1963, 1967
with P. I. Kuznetsov, V. I. Tikhonov: Nonlinear transformation of stochastic processes, Pergamon Press 1965
Conditional Markov processes and their application to the theory of optimal control, Elsevier 1968
Nonlinear Nonequilibrium Thermodynamics, 2 Volumes, Springer Series in Synergetics, 1992, 1994 (Volume 1: Linear and Nonlinear Fluctuation-Dissipation Theorem, Volume 2: Advanced Theory)

References

Further reading
F V Bunkin et al., In memory of Ruslan Leont'evich Stratonovich,  Physics-Uspekhi 40, 751–752, 1997 article
Professor R.L. Stratonovich: reminiscences of relatives, colleagues and friends edited by Yu. M. Romanovski, Publishing House of Computer Research Institute, Moscow-Izhevsk, 2007, 174 pages (in Russian). . This book contains the full list of Stratonovich's publications (monographs and journal papers, 185 items in total).
M. S. Yarlykov, Yu. A. Soloviev To the 80th Birthday of R. L. Stratonovich, Automation and Remote Control, Band 71, 2010, S. 1447–1450, Springer Link

1930 births
1997 deaths
Soviet mathematicians
Probability theorists
20th-century Russian mathematicians
Recipients of the USSR State Prize
State Prize of the Russian Federation laureates
Russian physicists
Moscow State University alumni
Academic staff of Moscow State University
Scientists from Moscow